Tepehuán (Tepehuano) is the name of three closely related languages of the Piman branch of the Uto-Aztecan language family, all spoken in northern Mexico.  The language is called O'otham by its speakers.

Northern Tepehuán
Northern Tepehuán is spoken by about 10,000 people (2020 census) in several settlements in Guadalupe y Calvo and Guachochi, Chihuahua, as well as in the north of Durango.

Southern Tepehuán
Southern Tepehuán is spoken by about 45,000 people, about equally divided into:

Southeastern Tepehuán in  Mezquital Municipio in the state of Durango. 
Southwestern Tepehuán in southwestern Durango.

Southern Tepehuán coexists with the Mexicanero language; there is some intermarriage between the two ethnic groups, and a number of speakers are trilingual in Mexicanero, Tepehuán and Spanish.

Media
Tepehuán-language programming is carried by the CDI's radio stations XEJMN-AM, broadcasting from Jesús María, Nayarit, and XETAR, based in Guachochi, Chihuahua.

Morphology
Tepehuán is an agglutinative language, in which words use suffix complexes for a variety of purposes with several morphemes strung together.

Phonology

Northern Tepehuan 
The following is representative of the Northern dialect of Tepehuan.

Vowels

Consonants 

Nasal consonants /n, ɲ/ become  when preceding a velar consonant.

Southern Tepehuan 
The following is representative of the Southeastern dialect of Tepehuan.

Vowels

Consonants 

Sample Tepehuan Text

Northern Tepehuan:

Southeastern Tepehuan:

Further reading

References

Piman languages
Agglutinative languages
Critically endangered languages
Indigenous languages of Mexico
Indigenous languages of the North American Southwest
Mesoamerican languages
Tepehuán-language radio stations
Vulnerable languages